Olech is a surname which is common in Poland. It also appears in Ukraine but is more commonly transliterated as Olekh. Notable people with the surname include:

 Artur Olech (1940–2010), Polish boxer
 Czesław Olech (1931–2015), Polish mathematician
 Janusz Olech (born 1965), Polish fencer
 Jarosław Olech (born 1974), Polish powerlifter
 Joanna Olech (born 1955), Polish author
 Maria Olech (born 1941), Polish Antarctic scientist
 Viktoriya Olekh (born 1993), Ukrainian skier

See also
 

Polish-language surnames
Ukrainian-language surnames